Instant Love is a 1982 album by American singer Cheryl Lynn, released on Columbia Records. Luther Vandross produced the album and also performed a duet with Lynn on "If This World Were Mine", a cover of the original recording by Marvin Gaye and Tammi Terrell. The arrangements were by Luther Vandross, Marcus Miller and Nat Adderley, Jr. The album peaked at #7 on the R&B album charts and #133 on The Billboard 200.

Coming off of his success with Aretha Franklin's "Jump to It," Cheryl and Luther delivered the title cut as a first single, but it only reached #16 on the R&B charts. The two artists did however make an impact with their duet on a remake of the Marvin Gaye & Tammi Terrell classic "If This World Were Mine" which became the biggest hit (#4 R&B) off of this album. A third single, "Look Before You Leap", stalled out at #77 on the R&B charts.

Track listing
 "Instant Love" - 5:12 (Luther Vandross, Marcus Miller)
 "Sleep Walkin'" - 6:27 (Vandross, Miller)
 "Day After Day" - 4:36 (Tawatha Agee)
 "Look Before You Leap" - 4:04 (David Batteau, Michael Sembello)
 "Say You'll Be Mine" - 5:07 (Agee, Kevin Robinson)
 "I Just Wanna Be Your Fantasy" - 4:04 (Cheryl Lynn, George Smith III)
 "Believe in Me" - 3:24 (Ashford & Simpson)
 "If This World Were Mine" (with Luther Vandross) - 5:27 (Marvin Gaye)

Bonus Tracks (2012 UK BBR Re-issue)
9. "Instant Love" (single edit) - 3:58

10. "If This World Were Mine" (with Luther Vandross) (single edit) - 4:00

References

External links
 Instant Love at Discogs

1982 albums
Cheryl Lynn albums
Columbia Records albums